White Meldon is a prehistoric site, a hillfort near the village of Lyne and about  west of Peebles, in the Scottish Borders, Scotland. It is a Scheduled Monument.

Description
The hill has elevation , and it is a Marilyn; it is a large hill, overlooking to the west the valley of Meldon Burn. The fort has four concentric lines of defence. Inside this area, the remains of at least 29 round-houses have been discerned, some of which are well-defined platforms.

There are fragments of an outermost rampart, which may not have been finished. The fort may have been built in stages, expanding from the innermost defence, the incomplete outer defence being the last stage; but the sequence of building has not been definitely established.

More than half of the interior is occupied by a later settlement, with a wall that on the west side incorporates the earlier construction. The enclosure is a scheduled monument, no. SM3165.

The group is a scheduled monument, no. SM2712.

References

Hill forts in Scotland
Archaeological sites in the Scottish Borders
Scheduled Ancient Monuments in the Scottish Borders
Mountains and hills of the Scottish Borders
Marilyns of Scotland